Iglesia de San Gil Abad is a church in Burgos, Spain. It dates to the 14th-15th century. It was declared a Bien de Interés Cultural site  by decree of 3 June 1931.

References

Roman Catholic churches in Burgos
Buildings and structures completed in the 14th century
Bien de Interés Cultural landmarks in the Province of Burgos